Cola Lacaye is a soft drink from Haiti founded by Rigobert Richardson in 1977. Today, Cola Lacaye soda is manufactured and distributed by The Brooklyn Bottling Group, which manufactures, distributes, and imports various Caribbean-based soft drinks and food.
Cola Lacaye comes in three island flavors; Fruit Cola, Fruit Champagne and Banana. 
Cola Lacaye is available in 12oz bottles and 2 liter bottles. Cola Lacaye has become part of the Haitian American cultural dining experience, especially for Rigobert's son, Ryan Richardson.

See also
 List of soft drinks by country

References

Cola brands
Haitian brands
Haitian drinks
Soft drinks